Events from the year 1803 in Canada.

Incumbents
Monarch: George III

Federal government
Parliament of Lower Canada: 3rd
Parliament of Upper Canada: 3rd

Governors
Governor of the Canadas: Robert Milnes
Governor of New Brunswick: Thomas Carleton
Governor of Nova Scotia: John Wentworth
Commodore-Governor of Newfoundland: Charles Morice Pole
Governor of St. John's Island: Edmund Fanning

Events
Thomas Jefferson completes Louisiana Purchase extending U.S. control west of the Mississippi River; federal plans to resettle Eastern tribes beyond the Mississippi soon begin.
John Colter becomes the fourth man selected by William Clark to join the Lewis and Clark Expedition.
The XY Company is reorganized under Alexander Mackenzie's name.
 First Canadian Paper Mill is built in Quebec.

Births
October 13 – Augustin-Norbert Morin, lawyer, judge, politician and Joint Premier of the Province of Canada (d.1865)
March 24 – Egerton Ryerson, politician, teacher, principal, Methodist minister (d.1882)
December 6 – Susanna Moodie, writer (d.1885)

Full date unknown
John Kinder Labatt, brewer and founder of the Labatt Brewing Company (d.1866)

Deaths
 Nathaniel Pettit (1724 – March 9, 1803) a political figure in Upper Canada.
 Rev. Johann Samuel Schwerdtfeger (1734–1803) The first Lutheran minister in Ontario.

References

 
Canada
Years of the 19th century in Canada
1803 in North America